International Review of Sport and Exercise Psychology is a peer-reviewed academic journal published by Routledge.

Abstracting and indexing 
The journal is abstracted and indexed in:
Science Citation Index Expanded
Scopus
Social Sciences Citation Index

According to the Journal Citation Reports, the journal has a 2020 impact factor of 20.652.

References

External links 

English-language journals
Psychology journals
Annual journals